The Tri-State version of the NWA Brass Knuckles Championship was a secondary championship that was defended sporadically and periodically in the NWA Tri-State promotion. Created in 1970, the title was used in specialty matches in which the combatants would wear brass knuckles. Throughout the history of the championship, it was activated for brief periods of time to spark interest in crowds. Usually, the novelty of the  brass knuckles matches wore off and promoter Leroy McGuirk would abandon the title for a period of time and then begin using it again. This took place off and on until the Tri-State promotion closed in early 1982. There were other brass knuckles championships used in the NWA, such as in Texas and Florida, where the titles were more prominent and defended on a regular basis.

Title history

See also
List of National Wrestling Alliance championships
Hardcore wrestling

References

National Wrestling Alliance championships
Regional professional wrestling championships
Hardcore wrestling championships